The 1922 South Carolina Gamecocks football team represented the University of South Carolina during the 1922 Southern Conference football season.  It was the team's first season in the Southern Conference (SoCon). Led by third-year head coach Sol Metzger, the Gamecocks compiled an overall record of 5–4 with a mark of 0–2 in conference play, tying for 18th place in the SoCon.

Schedule

References

South Carolina
South Carolina Gamecocks football seasons
South Carolina Gamecocks football